Jesús Maria Villareal (born 2 November 1928) was a Filipino sailor. He competed at the 1960 Summer Olympics, the 1964 Summer Olympics and the 1976 Summer Olympics.

References

External links
 
 

1928 births
Possibly living people
Filipino male sailors (sport)
Olympic sailors of the Philippines
Sailors at the 1960 Summer Olympics – Dragon
Sailors at the 1964 Summer Olympics – Dragon
Sailors at the 1976 Summer Olympics – Tempest
Sportspeople from Manila